Bronchocela is a genus of Asian lizards, commonly known as bloodsuckers, crested lizards, and forest lizards, in the family Agamidae.

Species
There are 13 species in the genus Bronchocela:

Nota bene: A binomial authority in parentheses indicates that the species was originally described in a genus other than Bronchocela.

References

Further reading
Kaup J (1827). "Zoologische Monographien ". Isis von Oken 20: 610–625. (Bronchocela, new genus, p. 619). (in German).

Bronchocela
Reptiles of Asia
Taxa named by Johann Jakob Kaup
Lizard genera